The Swedish Armed Forces Service Medal for National Defense (FMGSS) is a service medal awarded to soldiers, sailors, and non-commissioned officers of the Swedish Armed Forces. Established 26 June 2015 by Sverker Göranson Supreme Commander of the Swedish Armed Forces, this medal is part of efforts to retain military personnel. The Swedish Armed Forces Service Medal for National Defense falls into Category I: Other official medals of the armed forces order of wear.

Classes
The medal is awarded in four different classes depending on the length of service being recognized:

Bronze (FMGSSBM) - 4 years of service
Silver (FMGSSSM) - 6 years of service
Gold (FMGSSGM) - 8 years of service
Gold with Three Crowns clasp (FMGSSGMm3kr) - 12 years of service

Appearance
The medal is made of bronze, it may also be finished in silvered or gilded bronze. The obverse shows the Coat of arms of the Swedish Armed Forces surrounded by a laurel wreath open at the top. Above is the text För rikets försvar (For national defense). The reverse of the medal is plain.

References

Orders, decorations, and medals of Sweden
Awards established in 2015
2015 establishments in Sweden
Long service medals